The Hall Ministry was a ministry of the Government of South Australia, led by Liberal Country League Premier Steele Hall. It succeeded the First Dunstan Ministry on 17 April 1968, when Labor Premier Don Dunstan lost a motion of no confidence in the House of Assembly following the 1968 election on 2 March. It was in turn succeeded by the Second Dunstan Ministry on 2 June 1970 following the LCL government's defeat at the 1970 election.

The Ministry
The Ministry was sworn in by Governor Edric Bastyan on 17 April 1968.

On 2 March 1970, Glen Pearson resigned from the ministry ahead of his retirement from Parliament. A minor reshuffle took place.

The ministers listed served, except where indicated, until the end of the Ministry on 2 June 1970.

References

South Australian ministries